is a common masculine Japanese given name.

Possible writings
Shōta can be written using different kanji characters and can mean:
消太, "erase, thick"
正太, "correct, thick"
翔太, "soar, thick"
章太, "composition, thick"
奨太, "reward, thick"
将太, "general, thick"
The name can also be written in hiragana or katakana.

People with the name
, Japanese golfer
, Japanese singer, actor, and voice actor
, Japanese footballer
, Japanese footballer
, Japanese shogi player
, Japanese baseball player
, Japanese sumo wrestler
, Japanese footballer
, stage name Soul, Japanese singer, member of South Korean boy band P1Harmony
, Japanese footballer
 Shota Hazui (born 1986), Japanese water polo player
, Japanese rugby union player
, Japanese futsal player
, Japanese sprinter
, Japanese sumo wrestler
, Japanese footballer
, Japanese baseball player
, Japanese footballer
, Japanese baseball outfielder
, Japanese footballer 
, Japanese footballer
, Japanese footballer
, Japanese baseball player
, Japanese footballer
, Japanese footballer
, Japanese footballer
, Japanese baseball catcher
, Japanese actor
, Japanese footballer
, Japanese actor
, Japanese speed skater
, Japanese baseball player
, Japanese baseball pitcher
, Japanese baseball catcher
, Japanese footballer
, Japanese footballer
, Japanese footballer
, Japanese actor
, Japanese footballer
, Japanese slalom canoeist
, Japanese musician and singer-songwriter
, Japanese actor
, Japanese baseball player
, Japanese footballer
, Japanese footballer
, Japanese actor
, Japanese baseball pitcher
, Japanese baseball player
, Japanese professional wrestler

Fictional characters
/Sawyer, a character in the anime series Pokémon XY
, a character in the manga series My Hero Academia
, a character in the video game Tokimeki Memorial Girl's Side: 2nd Kiss
Shota Hikasa (日笠 将太), a character in the film Battle Royale II: Requiem
, a main character from anime and manga series Little Ghost Q-Taro
, a character in the manga series Kimi ni Todoke
, abbreviated "Shota", a character in the manga series Tetsujin 28-go
, a character in the manga series Miss Kobayashi's Dragon Maid
 Shota Shibata, a lead character in the 2018 movie Shoplifters

See also
Shota complex

Japanese masculine given names